Bouillante is a commune in the French overseas region and department of Guadeloupe, in the Lesser Antilles.

History
Bouillante was founded about 1635 with the arrival of some of Guadeloupe's first colonists. It was originally named Islets à Goyaves ("Islet of Guavas") until the beginning of the 18th century, when the name was changed to Fontaines Bouillantes after the island's hot springs that were known for their therapeutic virtues.

With the end of the Ancien Régime, the civil authorities and religious leaders renamed the city Bouillante. Saint Louis, the religious character, is the patron saint of the commune.

Bouillante knew its apogee during the 17th century. It occupied an important place on the island through the policy of the Kingdom of France. The king wanted to make Guadeloupe a colony of settlement based on the family small-scale farming and the introduction of volunteers. The latter, from France, were regarded as the first European inhabitants of the Caribbean. They learned the rudiments of tropical agriculture, different from their area of origin. The Amerindians were marginalized following the integral report/ratio of the two practical ones and they did not follow all the same route. The two enumerations, that of 1664 and that of 1671, reveal the destiny of the different groups.

After 1960, the commune knew major upheavals with the departure of a great number of young people for the cities.

Geography
Bouillante is located in the middle of the leeward coast, on the western coast of Basse-Terre Island. It lies between the communes of Pointe-Noire to the north, Vieux-Habitants to the south, and Petit-Bourg to the east. To the east, there is a large mountainous chain. Crossing the commune along its north–south axis is the national forest. The high point of this forest is the Piton of Bouillante.

The commune lies on steep volcanic slopes which descend abruptly to the sea. Its fertile volcanic soil allowed the growing of coffee, which was regarded as one of the best coffee in the world. Cotton, banana, and vanilla also greatly contributed to its economic success for many years.

Today, the economy of the commune is centered on tourism. Agriculture, fishing, the craft industry and geothermics still play a large part in the local economy.

Bouillante profits from its many coves and bays dotting the coast, and beaches such as Anse à la Barque, Petite Anse, Anse à sable and Malendure with its famous coral barrier which lodges the prestigious Réserve Cousteau. The beaches are largely open but are sheltered from the sometimes violent winds.

Population

Education
Public preschools include:
 Ecole maternelle Bourg Bouillante
 Ecole maternelle Malendure
 Ecole maternelle Pigeon

Public primary schools include:
 Ecole primaire Bourg de Bouillante
 Ecole primaire Galet-Malendure
 Ecole primaire Pigeon
 Ecole primaire Thomas
 Ecole primaire Village

Public junior high schools include:
 Collège Fontaines Bouillantes

Twin towns — Sister cities 

Bouillante is twinned with:
  Marlenheim (France)

See also
Communes of the Guadeloupe department

References

External links

 The official website of Bouillante (French version)
 The tourism and holidays in Guadeloupe, Bouillante (French version)

Communes of Guadeloupe